The Georgia Museum of Art is an art museum in Athens, Georgia, United States, associated with the University of Georgia (UGA). The museum is both an academic museum and, since 1982, the official art museum of the state of Georgia. The permanent collection consists of American paintings, primarily 19th- and 20th-century; American, European and Asian works on paper; the Samuel H. Kress Study Collection of Italian Renaissance paintings; growing collections of southern decorative arts and Asian art; and a strong collection of works by African American artists. It numbers more than 17,000 works, growing every year.

The Georgia Museum opened on UGA's North Campus in 1948, in a building that now houses the university president's office, then moved to the Performing and Visual Arts Complex on UGA's East Campus in 1996.  In 2011, it completed an extensive expansion and remodeling of its building, paid for entirely with externally raised funds and designed by Gluckman Mayner Architects, New York, that has allowed it to display its permanent collection continually.  The museum offers programming for patrons of all ages, from child to senior citizen, as well as free admission to the public for all exhibitions.  It organizes its own exhibitions in-house, creates traveling exhibitions for other museums and galleries and plays host to traveling exhibitions from around the country and the globe.  The museum strives, most of all, to fulfill the legacy of its founder, Alfred Heber Holbrook, and provide art for everyone, removing barriers to accessibility and seeking to foster an open, educational and inspiring environment for students, scholars and the general public.

The foundation of the museum's collection, the Eva Underhill Holbrook Memorial Collection of American Art, a collection of 100 American paintings, was donated to UGA in 1945 by Holbrook  in memory of his first wife. Included in this collection are works by Frank Weston Benson, William Merritt Chase, Stuart Davis, Arthur Dove, Georgia O'Keeffe, Childe Hassam, Winslow Homer, Jacob Lawrence, John Singer Sargent, and Theodore Robinson.

Selected collection highlights

References

External links
 New Georgia Encyclopedia article
Georgia Museum of Art within Google Arts & Culture

Art museums and galleries in Georgia (U.S. state)
University of Georgia campus
Museums in Clarke County, Georgia
Tourist attractions in Athens, Georgia
Art museums established in 1948
1948 establishments in Georgia (U.S. state)
University museums in Georgia (U.S. state)
Symbols of Georgia (U.S. state)